Feyikemi Abudu commonly known as FK Abudu is a Nigerian influencer and entrepreneur.

Biography 
Abudu was born in January 1993 in London, her mother Ekua Akinsanya (formerly Ekua Abudu) is a lawyer, chartered administrator and the proprietress of Greenwood House School, Ikoyi, she is also the former President of International Women's Society, her father Wale Abudu is a lawyer. Abudu is the granddaughter of businessman Taiwo Sagoe and Modupe Sagoe, a textile material entrepreneur in Lagos, from her father's side: her grandfather is a lawyer and businessman from Abeokuta, Chief Ayinla Olatunde Abudu, the Mayegun of Egbaland. She is also surrounded by people like Mo Abudu and Deola Sagoe, during an interview with Techpoint Africa''' in 2020, Abudu stated that she got her audacity from them.

Abudu studied entrepreneurship studies at Stanford Graduate School of Business and a degree in chemical engineering from University College London. She took a business development role at She Leads Africa, the financial empowerment forum for African women. 

Abudu has about 100,000 followers but she is not a full time influencer, her livelihood comes from organising business development training for banks and startups. Abudu's first campaign was with Taxify – now Bolt in 2017, she has also worked with multiple other brands. She was listed in the Time 100 list which aims to highlight the 100 individuals who are shaping the future of their fields and defining the next generation of leadership in business, entertainment, health and science, sports, activism, and more for her role in the 2020 End SARS protests. Abudu gained more following during her participation in the End SARS protest, she also hosts a podcast titled I Said What I Said alongside Jola Ayeye, a friend of hers.

She was listed as the most searched Nigerian personality of 2020 by Nigerian Entertainment Today''.

References 

Alumni of University College London
Living people
Stanford Graduate School of Business alumni
Social media influencers
Year of birth missing (living people)